Vergence may refer to:

Vergence, the simultaneous movement of both eyes in opposite directions, needed for binocular vision
Vergence (optics), the reciprocal of the distance between the point of focus and a reference plane
Vergence (geology), a property of deformed rock